The 2008 Asian Junior Men's Volleyball Championship was held in Azadi Sport Complex, Tehran, Iran from 23 August to 31 August 2008.

Pools composition
The teams are seeded based on their final ranking at the 2006 Asian Junior Men's Volleyball Championship.

* Withdrew

Preliminary round

Pool A

|}

|}

Pool B

|}

|}

Pool C

|}

|}

Pool D

|}

|}

Classification round
 The results and the points of the matches between the same teams that were already played during the preliminary round shall be taken into account for the classification round.

Pool E

|}

|}

Pool F

|}

|}

Pool G

|}

|}

Pool H

|}

|}

Classification 9th–12th

Semifinals

|}

11th place

|}

9th place

|}

Final round

Quarterfinals

|}

5th–8th semifinals

|}

Semifinals

|}

7th place

|}

5th place

|}

3rd place

|}

Final

|}

Final standing

Team Roster
Mojtaba Shaban, Alireza Jadidi, Hamed Bagherpour, Golmohammad Sakhavi, Farhad Salafzoun, Edris Daneshfar, Farhad Ghaemi, Ebrahim Chabokian, Arash Kamalvand, Mohammad Taher Vadi, Mojtaba Ghiasi
Head Coach: Mostafa Karkhaneh

Awards
MVP:  Mojtaba Ghiasi
Best Scorer:  Dai Qingyao
Best Spiker:  Dai Qingyao
Best Blocker:  Alireza Jadidi
Best Server:  Mojtaba Ghiasi
Best Setter:  Farhad Salafzoun
Best Digger:  Golmohammad Sakhavi
Best Receiver:  Shahrukh Khan

External links
 www.asianvolleyball.org
 www.volleyball.ir

A
V
Asian men's volleyball championships
International volleyball competitions hosted by Iran
Asian Junior